University Institute of Technology (UIT), Himachal Pradesh (erstwhile University Institute of Information Technology (UIIT), Himachal Pradesh) is in the Himachal Pradesh University campus at Summerhill, Shimla, India. It started functioning on 11 September 2000.

UIT has been producing professional leaders in the field of information technology, as well as enhancing the technological strength of the region and the country. Well known for its B.Tech in Information Technology programme throughout India, the institute benefits from close collaborations with the IT industry. Moreover in 2019 UIT has started to enroll five streams named CSE, IT, ECE, EE, CE.

UIT has a great record in many field-level works, one such example being an android application created by a student of UIT to record attendance by online methods, and many other things have been  done by UITians for betterment of society.

Facilities

Internet facility
The university has been provided by University Grants Commission a leased line of 50 Mbit/s (1:1) dedicated bandwidth as a part of UGC Infonet for Higher Education. UIT is a member of the Campus-Wide Optical Fibre Network on which the Internet facility is available on a 24×7 basis.

Campus
The campus has 14×6 Wi-Fi connectivity and banking facilities. Currently, classes are held in the new UIT Building, Silver Wood Estate, Near Police Station, Summerhill. The campus has great labs and classrooms which helps the student to learn in a great environment.

Departmemts
Department of Civil Engineering,
Department of Computer Science Engineering,
Department of Information Technology,
Department of Electrical Engineering,
Department of Electronics and Communications Engineering

Placements
Placement of the students is of major concern to the institute. For this purpose, a full-time placement cell under a faculty member has been created to liaison among the students and prospective employers and to keep a watchful eye on the emerging trends and future needs of the industry.

The institute has a good track record of placements with students placed in companies like Infosys, GlobalLogic, Sapient, Tata Consultancy Services, Accenture, Cognizant, Oracle, Satyam, Wipro, Tech Mahindra, NexTag, Impetus, Perot systems, and IBM.

Extra-curricular

The institute organizes events for the all-round development of the students. The biggest event is UTKARSH, a four-day inter-college festival in which colleges from in and around the state are invited to participate. The fest is conducted by Engineering Technology Students Association (ETSA) which has a president, vice president, finance secretary, cultural secretary, general secretary and joint secretary in the Governing Body. It is the only event of its kind on the campus which takes place at three venues simultaneously with 1500 to 2000 students. Other events include inter-college sports competition.

In UIT such functions like a fresher party, annual dinner are too arranged for the betterment of psychological part of students.

Alumni
Students from UIT work in prestigious companies like Google, Facebook, Juniper Networks, Royal Dutch Shell, Adobe, Microsoft, and Walmart Labs.

Change of Name
On 28 February 2020, the name of University Institute of Information Technology(UIIT) changed to University Institute of Technology(UIT) due to addition of other engineering branches.

See also 
 Himachal Pradesh University

References

Universities in Himachal Pradesh
Himachal Pradesh University
Education in Shimla